Taiwan Prefecture or Taiwanfu was a prefecture of Taiwan during the Qing dynasty. The prefecture was established by the Qing government in 1684, after the island came under Qing dynasty rule in 1683 following its conquest of the Kingdom of Tungning. The Taiwan Prefecture Gazetteer documented it as part of Fujian Province. The Gazetteer was completed by Gao Gonggan in 1695, the 34th year of the reign of the Kangxi Emperor. With the development and population growth of Taiwan during the Qing Era, the scope of Taiwan Prefecture was also varied over time. Following the establishment of Fujian-Taiwan Province in 1887, the prefecture correspondingly became a subdivision under the newly founded province.

1684–1723
When the Qing wrested the island from the control of the Kingdom of Tungning in 1683, Taiwan was made a prefecture under the administration of Fujian Province. The new prefecture consisted of three counties:
Zhuluo County, the central western plains and the north
, around the prefectural seat at Taiwan (now Tainan)
, which took up much of present-day Kaohsiung and Pingtung County
The aboriginal lands on the east coastknown to the Qing as the "Land Behind the Mountains"were not controlled at all.

1723–1875
During this period, Taiwan was administered as three counties and two subprefectures.

The counties (xiàn) were, from south to north:
Fongshan County: one town, 8 Chinese villages, 73 uncivilized native villages, 8 civilized native villages
Kagi County: one town, 4 Chinese villages, 22 uncivilized native villages, 8 civilized native villages
: one town, 16 villages
The subprefectures (tīng) were:
Pescadores Subprefecture
Tamsui Subprefecture: one town, 132 farms, 70 native villages

1875–1887
An administrative change occurred in 1875, when Imperial Commissioner Shen Pao-chen demanded that another prefecture be added in Taiwan to revamp the administrative organization of the northern area of the island. As a result, Taipeh Prefecture was created from part of Taiwan Prefecture.

1887–1895
Fokien-Taiwan Province was established in 1887, consisting of four prefectures: Taipeh, Taiwan, Tainan, and Taitung. Tainan Prefecture was created from part of Taiwan Prefecture. Thus Taiwan Prefecture was reduced to the area of central Taiwan only, composed of the modern-day Miaoli County, Taichung City, Nantou County, Changhua County, and Yunlin County.

The new prefecture seat was located at the central city of Toatun, which was also designated as the site of the new provincial capital, taking its name as Taiwanfu or Taiwan (now Taichung). However, during construction of the new capital, the provincial capital was temporarily relocated to the city of Taipeh (Taipei). One of the administrators of Taiwan Prefecture was Raymund Tu, a native priest of Taiwan.

Four years after development of Toatun began, the seat of Taipeh (Taipei) was officially declared the provincial capital.

In 1895, with the Treaty of Shimonoseki and the successful Japanese invasion of Taiwan, Taiwan Prefecture was abolished. Under Japanese rule, the province was abolished in favor of Japanese-style divisions.

See also
 Zhou (country subdivision)
 Taiwan under Qing rule
 Tainan and Taichung
 Taichū Prefecture

References

Citations

Bibliography

 

01
Prefectures of the Qing dynasty
Former prefectures in Fujian

1684 establishments in Taiwan
1895 disestablishments in China
1895 disestablishments in Taiwan
States and territories established in 1684
States and territories disestablished in 1895